The 1962–63 Notre Dame Fighting Irish men's basketball team represented the University of Notre Dame during the 1962–63 men's college basketball season.

Schedule

Roster

References

Notre Dame Fighting Irish men's basketball seasons
Notre Dame
Notre Dame
Notre Dame Fighting Irish
Notre Dame Fighting Irish